The Marshalls–Gilberts raids were tactical airstrikes and naval artillery attacks by United States Navy aircraft carrier and other warship forces against Imperial Japanese Navy (IJN) garrisons in the Marshall and Gilbert Islands on 1 February 1942.

Units and commanders
The Japanese garrisons were under the overall command of Vice Admiral Shigeyoshi Inoue, commander of the 4th Fleet. Japanese aircraft in the islands belonged to the IJN's 24th Air Flotilla under Rear Admiral Eiji Gotō. The U.S. warship forces were under the overall command of Vice Admiral William Halsey, Jr.

Raids
The raids were carried out by two separate U.S. carrier task forces. Aircraft from Task Force 17 (TF 17), commanded by Rear Admiral Frank Jack Fletcher and centered on the carrier , attacked Jaluit, Mili, and Makin (Butaritari) islands. The Yorktown aircraft inflicted moderate damage to the Japanese naval installations on the islands and destroyed three aircraft. Seven Yorktown aircraft were lost (4 TBD Devastators, 3 SBD Dauntlesses) as well as an SOC Seagull floatplane from USS Louisville, one of TF 17's cruisers.

Aircraft from TF 8, commanded by Halsey and centered on the carrier , struck Kwajalein, Wotje, and Taroa. At the same time, cruisers and destroyers bombarded Wotje and Taroa. The strikes inflicted light to moderate damage on the three islands' naval garrisons, sank three small warships and damaged several others, including the light cruiser , and destroyed 15 Japanese aircraft. The heavy cruiser  was hit and slightly damaged by a Japanese aerial bomb, the Enterprise caught fire after a near miss by a bomb, and six Enterprise aircraft - five SBD Dauntless dive bombers and one F4F Wildcat fighter - were lost. TFs 8 and 17 retired from the area immediately upon completion of the raids.

Aftermath and significance
The raids had little long-term strategic impact. The IJN briefly sent two aircraft carriers to chase TFs 8 and 17, but quickly abandoned the pursuit and continued their support for the ongoing successful conquests of the Philippines and Netherlands East Indies. The raids, however, did help lift the morale of the U.S. Navy and the American public, still reeling from the Pearl Harbor attack and loss of Wake Island. The raids also provided valuable experience in carrier air operations, which hardened the U.S. carrier groups for future combat against Japanese forces. For their part the Japanese apparently did not realize that their concept of a perimeter defense using dispersed island garrisons had serious flaws in that the garrisons were too far apart to be sufficiently mutually supporting to prevent penetration by enemy carrier forces. Nevertheless the raids, along with the Doolittle Raid in April 1942, helped convince the IJN's Combined Fleet commander, Isoroku Yamamoto, that he needed to draw the American carriers into battle as soon as possible in order to destroy them. Yamamoto's plan to do so resulted in the Battle of Midway.

References

Notes

Books

Web

USS Enterprise photo archive of the raid

Marshall Islands in World War II
Kiribati in World War II
Gilbert Islands
Battles of World War II involving Japan
Naval aviation operations and battles
Naval battles of World War II involving the United States
World War II aerial operations and battles of the Pacific theatre
1942 in Japan
1942 in the Gilbert and Ellice Islands
February 1942 events
Japan–United States military relations
Attacks on military installations in the 1940s